Beaconhouse-Newlands is a private Boarding school currently operating in Pakistan and Malaysia. It is a group of private fee-paying academic institutions located currently in 2 cities of Pakistan. Beaconhouse provides preschool education, primary education, secondary education and preparation for the international International General Certificate of Secondary Education (IGCSE) and local Secondary School Certificate (SSC) examinations along with International Baccalaureate (IB) Program.

A-Level subjects 
 Accounting
 AICT
 Art and Design
 Biology
 Business Studies
 Chemistry
 Computer Science
 Economics
 English Literature
 Environmental Management (AS Level)
 Global Perspective
 Government and Politics
 History
 Law
 Mathematics
 Media Studies
 Physics
 Psychology
 Sociology
 Urdu
 General Paper
 Thinking Skills

The Learning Tower 
 

The Learning Tower is a four-storey glass and concrete building situated at the Lahore campus of Beaconhouse-Newlands. The Learning Tower has more than 15,000 books on vast genres and an access to unlimited world of global e-books available online.

Clubs and Societies 
 
 The Drama Club
 Media and Photography
 Music Society
 Community Work
 Orator's Den Club
 Cooking Club
 Mandarin Club
 Public Speaking Club
 Crafts & Design Club
 How we express our self Club
 Calligraphy Club
 Digital Storytelling Club
 Self Defence Club
 Environmental Club
 TED Ed Club
 Wordsmith Club
 Math’s and Mind Games Club
 Robotics Club
 STEAM Club
 ادب اور آداب
 Scouting Club
 Debates Club
 Tech and Design Club

Sporting Facilities 
 
 Football
 Cricket
 Basketball
 Volleyball
 Martial Arts
 Badminton
 Table Tennis
 Gymnastic
 Aerobics
 Kids Athletics
 Athletics
Facilities at BN and Sports Complex
 Swimming pool
 Football field
 Basketball court
 Cricket pitch
 Volleyball court
 Indoor Gymnasium for Multi-Sports
 Fitness Suite
Bedian Sports Complex
 Cricket Ground and Football ground with Pavilion
 400m eight lane Athletics track
 2 Basketball Courts
 Horse Riding Club

References

External links

Private schools in Pakistan
Education in Lahore